The Sternstein Manor is a 1976 West German drama film directed by Hans W. Geißendörfer. It was entered into the 10th Moscow International Film Festival.

Cast
  as Leni Zinshofer
 Tilo Prückner as Nepomuk Kleebinder aka Muckerl
 Gustl Bayrhammer as Sternsteinhofbauer sen.
 Peter Kern as Toni Stadlhofer - Sternsteinhofbauer jr.
  as Zinshoferin
 Elfriede Kuzmany as Kleebinderin
 Ulrike Luderer as Sepherl
 Irm Hermann as Sali
 Maria Stadler as Katel
 Horst Richter as Käsbiermartel
 Helmut Alimonta as Farm Hand
 Jürgen Schornagel as Priest
  as Dr. Swoboda

References

External links
 

1976 films
1976 drama films
German drama films
West German films
1970s German-language films
Films based on Austrian novels
Films based on works by Ludwig Anzengruber
Films directed by Hans W. Geißendörfer
Films set in Bavaria
Films set in the Alps
Films set in the 1880s
1970s German films